The 2018 Emir of Qatar Cup is the 46th edition of the Qatari cup tournament in men's football. It will be played by the first and second level divisions of the Qatari football league structure. The cup winner is guaranteed a place in the 2019 AFC Champions league.

The draw of the tournament was held on 11 April 2018.

Note: all matches in Qatar time (GMT+3).

Preliminary round

Tuesday 10/04/2018

time: 6:30 PM

Muaither 0–2 Al-Shamal

First round

Monday 23/04/2018

time: 5:15 PM

Al-Mesaimeer 0–0 (3–1 p) Al-Ahli (match 1)

time: 8:00 PM

Al-Wakrah 3–2 Qatar SC (match 2)

Tuesday 24/04/2018

time: 5:15 PM

Al-Shamal 1–4 Al-Markhiya (match 3)

time: 8:00 PM

Al-Shahania 1–3 Al-Kharaitiyat (match 4)

Second round

Saturday 28/04/2018

time: 5:15 PM

Al-Khor 1–1 (10–9 p) Al-Markhiya (match 5)

time: 8:00 PM

Umm Salal 5–0 Al-Kharaitiyat (match 6)

Sunday 29/04/2018

time: 5:15 PM

Al-Sailiya 0–1 Al-Mesaimeer (match 7)

time: 8:00 PM

Al-Arabi 4–0 Al-Wakrah (match 8)

Quarter-finals

Thursday 03/05/2018

time 5:15 PM

Al-Sadd 4–0 Al-Khor (match 9)

time: 8:00 PM

Al-Duhail 1–0 Umm Salal (match 10)

Friday 04/05/2018

time: 5:15 PM

Al-Gharafa 1–0 Al-Mesaimeer (match 11)

time: 8:00 PM

Al-Rayyan 3–0 Al-Arabi (match 12)

Semi-finals

Friday 11/05/2018

time: 7:00 PM

Al-Sadd 0–1 Al-Duhail (match 13)

Saturday 12/05/2018

time: 7:00 PM

Al-Gharafa 0–3 Al-Rayyan (match 14)

Final

Saturday 19/05/2018

time: 10:15 PM

Al-Duhail 2–1 Al-Rayyan

References

External links
Emir Cup, Qatar Football Association

Football cup competitions in Qatar
2018 Asian domestic association football cups